Mynydd Bach Trecastell is a hill on the border between the counties of Carmarthenshire and Powys in southwest Wales. It lies within the Black Mountain (range)  of the Brecon Beacons National Park and Fforest Fawr Geopark. Its summit is plateau-like and reaches a height of 412m at OS grid ref SN 827312 at Y Pigwn. The name signifies the 'little hill of castle town'.

Geology
The summit of the hill is formed in sandstones and siltstones of the Cae'r Mynach Formation which like all of the rocks are tilted steeply to the southeast as part of a geological structure called the Myddfai Steep Belt. The flaggy micaceous sandstones of the Tilestones Formation immediately overlies these beds and this is followed in turn by the thick sequence of the Raglan Mudstone Formation.  These latter two formations are assigned as the oldest parts of the Old Red Sandstone though date from the Silurian. To the northwest are the various sandstones, mudstones and siltstones of the Aberedw, Hafod Fawr, Cwm Graig Ddu and Halfway Farm Formations. A series of northwest to southeast aligned faults cut through this succession and give rise to minor features in the landscape.

Archaeology

There are several round barrows and a stone circle on Mynydd Bach Trecastell dating to Bronze Age Britain. The Roman roads from CICVCIVM (Y Gaer) to MORIDVNVM (Moridunum, Carmarthen) via Llandovery ran over the hill and evidence of a couple of castras and a Roman fortlet remains on the hill.

Access
Mynydd Bach Trecastell is largely designated as open country and so freely accessible to walkers. The old Roman road provides access onto the hill from the Trecastle direction.

References

External links
 Images of Mynydd Bach Trecastell and surrounding area on Geograph website

Mountains and hills of Carmarthenshire
Mountains and hills of Powys
Black Mountain (hill)